SkyMall is a specialty publishing firm headquartered in Ridgefield Park, New Jersey, best known for once publishing a self-titled in-flight publication, SkyMall, that at one point had an annual circulation of approximately 20 million copies distributed in airplane seat pockets. At one point, it reached 88% of US airlines passengers. SkyMall is a multi-channel, direct marketer offering products through direct marketers and manufacturers through its SkyMall catalogue and website, skymall.com.

In January 2015, the company filed for Chapter 11 bankruptcy protection. In April 2015, it was purchased in bankruptcy court by C&A Marketing.

History 
SkyMall, Inc. was founded in 1990 by Bob Worsley, Alan Lobock, Matthew Del Bianco, and Graham Alcock. Originally, it intended to "get customers to order within 20 minutes of landing and have the goods waiting for them on arrival", before it switched to home delivery. Same-day delivery required SkyMall to operate its own warehouses near select airports.

Shortly after launching, the company purchased contracts from another company that allowed it to offer catalog merchandise to travelers flying U.S. air carriers. This move, which did not receive the support of all of the founders, required a significant shift in SkyMall's focus and operations, ultimately forcing the company to abandon same-day delivery and nearly bankrupting it. The company now offers goods from other companies' catalogs for drop-ship to the customer via third-party transport firms.

The company drastically changed its business model around 1993. Instead of stocking the merchandise itself near airports, Skymall began leasing sections of the magazines to various distributors which customers would then order from directly. Smithsonian magazine has credited this decision with saving the company.

Since 1999, SkyMall ownership has "bounced around among several private-equity companies", including by Najafi Companies, the largest private equity firm in Arizona in 2012. In 2009 SkyMall's website "generated approximately $80.5 million in revenue", making it the 185th largest e-commerce website by revenue.

On May 17, 2013, SkyMall merged with Xhibit Corp, described as a new "marketing software and digital advertising company that trades on an 'over-the-counter' exchange where equity shares of small companies can be bought and sold". In less than two years, SkyMall, LLC and several affiliated companies, including its parent company Xhibit Corp., voluntarily filed for Chapter 11 bankruptcy protection in the United States Bankruptcy Court for the District of Arizona on January 22, 2015. 

On April 1, 2015, SkyMall was purchased out of bankruptcy court by C&A Marketing for $1.9 million; the new owners plan to re-launch the catalog with a new product selection that will partially downplay the brand's association with novelty items in favor of "more of the innovative, fun, cool products that people are looking for, but that are still in keeping with the DNA of SkyMall."

Products
Although Skymall started as a conventional retailer, it was quickly realized that consumers weren't likely to buy them as they were to buy "unconventional items". One of the top-selling items upon the company filing for bankruptcy, for instance, was a Yeti statue. The Washington Post described the catalog's offerings as "whimsical".

Departments

 Apparel & Accessories
 Automotive & Hardware
 Computers
 Electronics
 Health & Wellness
 Home Living
 Office
 Outdoor Living
 Pets
 Seasonal
 Sporting Goods
 Toys, Hobbies & Collectibles
 Travel

Participating stores 

 Casio
 Design Toscano
 Diversions Catalog
 Driving Comfort by AutoSport
 Footsmart
 Gadget Universe
 Hammacher Schlemmer
 Improvementscatalog.com
 Plow and Hearth
 Steiner Sports
 Successories
 TigerDirect
 The Greatest Gift

Airlines with SkyMall on flights

Recent
 American Airlines and American Eagle - ended January 2015
 United Airlines - ended January 2015
 Delta Air Lines - ended November 2014
 Southwest Airlines - ended April 2015

Historical
 American Airlines/US Airways/American Eagle/TWA/America West Airlines
 United Airlines/Continental Airlines/Eastern Airlines
 Delta Air Lines/Northwest Airlines
 Southwest Airlines/AirTran Airways
 Alaska Airlines
 National Airlines
 SkyWest Airlines/Atlantic Southeast Airlines
 Frontier Airlines/Midwest Airlines
 Sun Country

References

External links
 SkyMall website
 "'Where the Wings Have No Shame': What's SkyMall culture really about?", Slate.com, April 18, 2007
 "SkyMall and GuestLogix to develop onboard shopping service", DFNIonline, February 21, 2008
 "Coffee, Tea, Lawn Ghoul?" by Sarah Kershaw, April 29, 2009, New York Times

Retail companies of the United States
Retail companies established in 1990
Inflight magazines
Companies that filed for Chapter 11 bankruptcy in 2015